Shenango can refer to:
 Camp Shenango a World War II Military Personnel Replacement Depot
 Shenango Township, Lawrence County, Pennsylvania
 Shenango Township, Mercer County, Pennsylvania
 Shenango, West Virginia
 Shenango River
 Shenango, one of several alternative names for Logstown, a Native American village in eastern Pennsylvania.